1. A Boitel (nound) was a unity of measure used in Beauvais (France-Picardy) during the 14th century. It corresponded to three English gallons (dry).

2. Boitel is a surname, and may refer to:
 Guillaume Boitel, companion of Bertrand du Guesclin,
 Jeanne Boitel (1904–1987), French actress
 Maurice Boitel (1919–2007), French painter
 Pedro Luis Boitel (1931–1972), Cuban poet and dissident
 Achille Boitel, French businessman.

3.Boitel: other uses:
 The Boitel was a small car exhibited at the Paris Motor Show in 1946, 1947 and 1948, shortly after which the manufacturer ran out of money.